William James Critchlow Jr. (August 21, 1892 – August 30, 1968) was a general authority of the Church of Jesus Christ of Latter-day Saints (LDS Church) from 1958 until his death.

Critchlow was born in Brigham City, Utah Territory. In 1934, he became a high priest in the LDS Church and in 1941 he became the first president of the church's South Ogden Stake.

On 11 October 1958, Critchlow became an Assistant to the Quorum of the Twelve Apostles. He held this position until his death in Ogden, Utah.

References
2005 Deseret News Church Almanac (Salt Lake City, Utah: Deseret News, 2004) p. 75
Encyclopedia of Mormonism, vol. 4, app. 1

External links
Grampa Bill's G.A. Pages: William J. Critchlow Jr.

1892 births
1968 deaths
American general authorities (LDS Church)
Assistants to the Quorum of the Twelve Apostles
People from Brigham City, Utah
People from Ogden, Utah
Latter Day Saints from Utah